Roy M. Terry (July 15, 1915 – May 12, 1988) was Chief of Chaplains of the United States Air Force.

Born in Brooklyn, New York, Terry later moved to Danbury, Connecticut and was an ordained Methodist pastor. He was a graduate of Syracuse University (B.S. 1937) and Yale Divinity School (B.D. 1942). Terry died on May 12, 1988.

Career
Terry originally joined the United States Army Air Forces in 1942. During World War II, he served in the European Theatre. He left active duty following the war.

Recalled to active duty in 1949 as a member of the United States Air Force, he was stationed at Maxwell Air Force Base. He was later assigned to Clark Air Base in the Philippines.

Later assignments included serving at The Pentagon, Headquarters Fifth Air Force, Headquarters Aerospace Defense Command and the United States Air Force Academy. He served as Deputy Chief of Chaplains of the United States Air Force from 1968 until 1970, when he was promoted to Chief of Chaplains with the rank of major general. Terry held this position until his retirement in 1974.

Awards he received include the Legion of Merit with oak leaf cluster, the Bronze Star Medal, the Air Force Commendation Medal with oak leaf cluster, the Army Commendation Medal with two oak leaf clusters and the Distinguished Unit Citation with oak leaf cluster.

References

People from Brooklyn
People from Danbury, Connecticut
United States Air Force generals
United States Army officers
Chiefs of Chaplains of the United States Air Force
American Methodist clergy
Recipients of the Legion of Merit
Syracuse University alumni
Yale Divinity School alumni
1988 deaths
World War II chaplains
Korean War chaplains
1915 births
20th-century American clergy